The following highways are numbered 664:

Canada

United States